

The Antihydrogen Trap (ATRAP) collaboration at the Antiproton Decelerator facility at CERN, Geneva, is responsible for the AD-2 experiment. It is a continuation of the TRAP collaboration, which started taking data for the PS196 experiment in 1985. The TRAP experiment (PS196) pioneered cold antiprotons, cold positrons, and first made the ingredients of cold antihydrogen to interact. Later ATRAP members pioneered accurate hydrogen spectroscopy and observed the first hot antihydrogen atoms.

Experimental setup

ATRAP is a collaboration between physicists around the world with the goal of creating and experimenting with antihydrogen. ATRAP accumulates positrons emitted from a radioactive 22Na source. 
There are two effective ways to slow down the fast positrons by inelastic processes. The ATRAP collaboration initially chose a different method to ATHENA (AD-1).

Slowing down and trapping positron 
The positrons which were emitted by the 22Na were first slowed down with a 10 µm thick titanium foil and then passed through a 2 µm thick tungsten crystal.
Within the crystal there is a possibility that a positively charged positron and a negatively charged electron form a Rydberg Positronium atom. In this process, the positrons lose much of their energy so that it is no longer necessary (as in ATHENA) to decelerate further with collisions in gas. When the loosely bound Rydberg positronium atom reaches the Penning trap at the end of the apparatus, it is ionized and the positron is caught in the trap.

Since this method of positron accumulation was not particularly efficient, ATRAP switched to a Surko-type buffer gas accumulator as is now standard in experiments requiring large numbers of positrons. This has led to the storage of the largest ever number of positrons in an Ioffe trap.

Unlike ATHENA, ATRAP has not yet been terminated and can be continuously improved and expanded. ATRAP now has an Ioffe trap, which can store the electrically neutral antihydrogen using a magnetic quadrupole field. This is possible because the magnetic moment of antihydrogen is non-zero. It is intended that laser spectroscopy will be performed on antihydrogen stored in the Ioffe trap.

ATRAP collaboration
The ATRAP collaboration comprises the following institutions:

References

External links 
Record for ATRAP experiment on INSPRE-HEP 
Particle experiments
CERN experiments